Le Maistre (also Lemaistre, leMaistre) is a surname, and may refer to:

 Antoine Le Maistre (1608–1658), French Jansenist lawyer, author and translator
 Catherine Lemaistre (1590-1651), French religious figure
 Charles LeMaistre (1925-2017), U.S. medical doctor
 Janice leMaistre, Canadian judge
 Jean Le Maistre, Vice-Inquisitor for Rouen, at the Trial of Joan of Arc
 Louis-Isaac Lemaistre de Sacy (1613-1684), French priest
 Malcolm Le Maistre  (born 1949), English musician, experimental artist and theatre director
 Mattheus Le Maistre (c.1505–1577), Flemish choirmaster and composer
 Stephen Caesar Le Maistre (died 1777), British judge in India

See also

 
 
 Le Maitre (surname)
 De Maistre (surname)
 Maistre (surname)